Robert A. Nardolillo (born July 7, 1979) is an American politician and a Republican member of the Rhode Island House of Representatives representing District 28 from 2015 to 2018.

Nardolillo ran in the 2018 U.S. Senate election in Rhode Island but eventually withdrew his candidacy for the seat.

Education
Nardolillo graduated from La Salle Military Academy in 1997 and received an Associate of Arts degree in applied sciences from Arapahoe Community College in Littleton, Colorado in 2002.

Electoral history

References

External links
 Official page at the Rhode Island General Assembly
 
 Robert Nardolillo at Ballotpedia

1979 births
21st-century American politicians
Candidates in the 2018 United States Senate elections
Living people
Republican Party members of the Rhode Island House of Representatives
People from Coventry, Rhode Island